Estil Fretwell (born September 1, 1952) is an American politician who served in the Missouri House of Representatives from the 1st district from 1979 to 1987.

References

1952 births
Living people
Democratic Party members of the Missouri House of Representatives